Anirudh Devgan, Ph.D (b. September 15th, 1969) is an Indian-American computer scientist. 

Devgan currently serves as President and CEO of Cadence Design Systems and member of the board of directors. He also serves on the boards of the Global Semiconductor Alliance and the ESD Alliance.

Early years and education 

Devgan was born and raised in New Delhi, India, on the Indian Institute of Technology, Delhi campus where his father was a professor of mathematics and statistics. He attended Delhi Public School, and later went on to the Indian Institute of Technology, Delhi.  After graduating with a Bachelor of Technology degree in electrical engineering, he attended Carnegie Mellon University where he received M.S. and Ph.D. degrees in electrical and computer engineering.

Career 

Devgan began his career at International Business Machines Corporation (IBM) where he spent 12 years in management and research at the IBM Thomas J. Watson Research Center, IBM Server Division, IBM Microelectronics Division, and IBM Austin Research Lab.

He later went to Magma Design Automation where he served as Corporate Vice President and General Manager, Custom Design Business Unit.
 
In 2012, Devgan joined Cadence Design Systems serving in a number of senior leadership roles before being named President in 2017. In 2021, Devgan joined the board of directors, and later assumed the role of CEO, taking over from Lip-Bu Tan.

Devgan resides in Silicon Valley.

References 

Electronic design automation people
Year of birth missing (living people)
Living people
Carnegie Mellon University alumni
IIT Delhi alumni